Mohamed Khaldoun Ragheb (born 26 February 1943) is a Syrian sports shooter. He competed in the Mixed skeet event at the 1984 Summer Olympics in Los Angeles, United States. During his training period for the 1984 Summer Olympics, his son, Maher Ragheb, would accompany him to training everyday. Maher would end up winning multiple shooting competitions in the United Arab Emirates.

References

1943 births
Living people
Syrian male sport shooters
Olympic shooters of Syria
Shooters at the 1984 Summer Olympics
Place of birth missing (living people)